Jean-Pierre Aumont (born Jean-Pierre Philippe Salomons; 5 January 1911 – 30 January 2001) was a French actor, and holder of the Légion d'Honneur and the Croix de Guerre for his World War II military service.

Early life 
Aumont was born Jean-Pierre Philippe Salomons in Paris, the son of Suzanne (née Cahen; 1885–1940), an actress, and Alexandre Salomons, owner of La Maison du Blanc (a linen department store). His mother's uncle was well-known stage actor Georges Berr (died 1942). His father was from a Dutch Jewish family; his mother's family were French Jews. Aumont's younger brother was the noted French film director François Villiers.

Career 
At age 16 Aumont began studying drama at the Paris Conservatory, where his mother had also studied. His professional stage debut occurred at the age of 19. His film debut came one year later, when Jean de la Lune (Jean of the Moon) was produced in 1931.

However, his most important, career-defining role came in 1934, when Jean Cocteau's play, La Machine infernale (The Infernal Machine), was staged. While his film and stage career began rising quickly, World War II broke out. Aumont remained in France until 1942, when he realized that as a Jew he would have to flee the Nazis. He migrated from the unoccupied zone of Vichy France  to New York City, then to Hollywood to pursue his film career. He began working for MGM, but after finishing The Cross of Lorraine, he joined the Free French Forces. He was sent to North Africa, where he participated in Operation Torch in Tunisia. He then moved with the Allied armies through Italy and France. He was wounded twice. The first was on a mission with his brother; the second was more serious. Aumont's Jeep was blown up near a land-mined bridge. General Diego Brosset, commander of the 1st Free French Division, to whom Aumont was aide de camp, was killed. For his bravery during the fighting, Aumont received the Légion d'Honneur and the Croix de Guerre.

After the war, Aumont quickly resumed his movie career, starring opposite Ginger Rogers in Heartbeat (1946), and as the magician in Lili (1953) with Leslie Caron, among many other roles. He worked with a number of prominent directors and stars, including his (then) wife Maria Montez. In the mid-1950s, Aumont began working in the new medium of television, appearing on several anthology programs, such as Robert Montgomery Presents and as a guest on the show What's My Line?. In the 1960s and 1970s, he appeared in various theater productions, including the musicals Tovarich with Vivien Leigh, Jacques Brel Is Alive and Well and Living in Paris, South Pacific, and Gigi.

One of his last acting performances was in A Tale of Two Cities (1989). Two years later, in 1991, aged 80, he received an  honorary César Award as well as being decorated with the cross of Commandeur des Arts et des Lettres.

Personal life 

Aumont was married four times to three women. His first wife was French actress Blanche Montel, to whom he was married for two years (1938–1940), ultimately divorcing. While in Hollywood, Aumont married Maria Montez, a Dominican actress. She was known as the Queen of Technicolor, and their marriage was very happy. However, Montez drowned in her bathtub on 7  September 1951 after suffering an apparent heart attack at the family's Suresnes villa. Montez and Aumont had one child, a daughter, Tina (1946–2006).

In 1955, Aumont was dating Grace Kelly at the time she first met Prince Rainier III of Monaco.

In 1956, Aumont married Italian actress Marisa Pavan. The couple starred in one film together, John Paul Jones (1959), in which Pavan played the romantic interest of the lead, while Aumont appears as King Louis XVI. They divorced, but later remarried and remained together until his death. Aumont and Pavan had two sons, Jean-Claude and Patrick.

Death 
Jean-Pierre Aumont died in 2001 of a heart attack in Gassin, France, aged 90, and was cremated.

Filmography

References

External links 

  (archived 2009)

1911 births
2001 deaths
Male actors from Paris
Burials at Père Lachaise Cemetery
French male film actors
French Ashkenazi Jews
French military personnel of World War II
French male musical theatre actors
French male stage actors
Jewish American male actors
Metro-Goldwyn-Mayer contract players
Recipients of the Croix de Guerre 1939–1945 (France)
César Honorary Award recipients
French expatriate male actors in the United States
French National Academy of Dramatic Arts alumni
20th-century French male singers